Pozzallo is a town and comune in the province of Ragusa, Sicily, southern Italy.  

Pozzallo  is now a major summer tourist destination: as of March 2020, two beaches in Pozzallo hold a Blue Flag award, presented by the FEE and given to beaches which meet strict criteria dealing with water quality, environmental education and information, environmental management, and safety and other services. Very few beaches retain this award in Sicily, including the two located in Pozzallo.

It is also a major port which creates the link between Sicily and Malta (about 90 minutes on high speed ferry) for passengers on a catamaran service.

The main monument of the city is Torre Cabrera, a 15th century watchtower built by Bernat Juan de Cabrera, son of Bernat II de Cabrera.

Gallery

References

Municipalities of the Province of Ragusa